Tân Vạn is a ward located in Biên Hòa city of Đồng Nai province, Vietnam. It has an area of about 4.3km2 and the population in 2018 was 14,086.

References

Bien Hoa